Ivan Vajda (born 4 September 1978) is a former professional tennis player from Croatia.

Biography
Vajda, who was born in 1978, began his career on the satellite tour in 1995. He won his first Futures title in 1998, the Pakistan F1 in Islamabad, then in 2000 he won the Macedonia F3 tournament held in Skopje. His two ATP Tour main draw appearances in singles both came at the Croatia Open Umag, as a qualifier in 2000 and as a wildcard entrant in the 2001 tournament. In June 2001 he reached his best ranking of 223 in the world and made the second round of qualifying at the Wimbledon Championships. Later that year he appeared for the Croatia Davis Cup team in a World Group qualifying tie against Italy in Rome. He featured in a dead rubber reverse singles match, which he lost to Italian Filippo Volandri.

Retiring in 2007, Vajda now works as a tennis coach based in Zagreb, where he runs a tennis academy.

See also
List of Croatia Davis Cup team representatives

References

External links
 
 
 

1978 births
Living people
Croatian male tennis players